Else Berit Eikeland (born 22 October 1957) is a Norwegian diplomat.

She started working for the Norwegian Ministry of Foreign Affairs in 1987. She became subdirector in 1998 before embarking on a counsellor position at the Norwegian embassy in London from 2004 to 2006. She returned to the Ministry of Foreign Affairs as senior adviser, then head of department from 2007. She served as the Norwegian ambassador to Canada from 2009 to 2012, polar affairs adviser and ambassador to the Arctic Council from 2013 to 2016, and ambassador to Ireland from 2016 to 2020, and ambassador to Estonia in 2020.

References

1957 births
Living people
Norwegian civil servants
Norwegian expatriates in the United Kingdom
Ambassadors of Norway to Canada
Ambassadors of Norway to Ireland
Norwegian women ambassadors